Acrida cinerea, sometimes called the Oriental longheaded grasshopper/locust or the Chinese grasshopper though this name is also applied to Oxya chinensis, is a member of the Acrididae family. Like other members of the genus Acrida, Acrida cinerea lacks stridulatory organs on its legs and so they do not make noise while moving.

Historically it has been used as a human food source, and it has been investigated for its nutritional value for the poultry industry.

Description
They are either green or brown in color with colorless wings. A. cinerea has long legs which allow it to jump long distances.

References

External links

cinerea
Insects described in 1815